The 2014 Balkans Cup was a rugby league football tournament that was held in Serbia between 17 October and 19 October. The winner won the inaugural Balkans Cup Trophy.

Four teams competed in the 2014 event. These teams were: Serbia, Greece, Hungary and Bosnia.

After winning the European Championship C a week before the tournament began, Greece transferred their form to the tournament and were crowned inaugural Balkans Cup winners after defeating Bosnia and then Serbia in the final.

Teams

Venues

Fixtures

Day 1

Serbia v. Hungary

Bosnia v. Greece

Day 2 - Finals Day

Third Place Final: Bosnia v. Hungary

Grand Final: Serbia v. Greece

Greece are the inaugural Balkans Cup champions

References

2014
2014 in rugby league
2014 in Serbian sport
2014 in Greek sport
2014 in Hungarian sport
2014 in Bosnia and Herzegovina